Bobb Trimble (born August 4, 1958) is a psychedelic folk/outsider musician from Marlborough, Massachusetts.

Biography
He released two full-length albums, Iron Curtain Innocence in 1980 and Harvest of Dreams in 1982. Following the latter's release, Trimble's recording activities ceased.

Over the next two decades, he gained a cult following, which included Ariel Pink and Sonic Youth's Thurston Moore. His records, originally pressed in quantities of 500 or less, became collectors items, some selling for as much as $1,500.

During the early 1980s, he had two backing bands: The Kidds (the average age of the band members was 12 years old) and The Crippled Dog Band (average age was 15 years). "Suspicious parents" pulled the plug on both bands.

Reissues
2002 saw the release of Life Beyond the Doghouse, a vinyl-only compilation on Orpheus Records comprising unreleased recordings made by Trimble between 1983 and 1986.

Iron Curtain Innocence and Harvest of Dreams were re-released in 2007 by the Secretly Canadian label, each with a handful of bonus tracks.

References

External links
bobbtrimble.com - Trimble's official site
Bobb Trimble at Facebook
Bobb Trimble at MySpace
[ Bobb Trimble] at AllMusic

1958 births
Living people
Outsider musicians
Secretly Canadian artists